Eugène Guillaume Anspach (7 February 1833 – 21 December 1890) was a Belgian lawyer, civil servant, and former governor of the National Bank of Belgium (NBB) from 1888 until 1890. Born in Brussels, he was a convinced protestant.

Career
He was appointed as censor  of the NBB in 1864 and as a member of the discount committee of the bank in 1868. In 1870 he was made a director and in 1882 he became vice-governor. He was appointed governor of the bank in 1888.

As governor of the National Bank of Belgium he took an interest in the efficient organisation of the discount offices and the branches of the NBB. The gradual disintegration of the Latin Monetary Union made him, together with Eudore Pirmez and Walthère Frère-Orban, try to restore monetary order.

Anspach died in Brussels on 21 December 1890.

References
 Kauch, P., in : Biographie Nationale, Brussels, Académie Royale des Sciences, des Lettres et des Beaux Arts, 1866-1986, XXIX, 1957, kol. 123-126.
 Eugène Anspach

1833 births
1890 deaths
Jurists from Brussels
Governors of the National Bank of Belgium
19th-century Belgian civil servants